Fjölnisvöllur is a football stadium in Iceland. It is located in Grafarvogur, Reykjavík, and seats 700 individuals in one stand, but can hold about 500 standing spectators additionally. It is the home stadium for Icelandic football team Fjölnir.

Football venues in Iceland
Sports venues in Reykjavík